Sally Rogers (born 1964) is an English actress.

Sally Rogers may also refer to:

 Sally Rogers (artist) (c. 1790–1813), American painter
 Sally Rogers (character), a character in The Dick Van Dyke Show
 Sally J. Rogers (born 1950), American academic in autism